Stephan Hauck (born 17 August 1961) is a German former handball player. He competed at the 1988 Summer Olympics and the 1992 Summer Olympics.

References

External links
 

1961 births
Living people
German male handball players
Olympic handball players of East Germany
Olympic handball players of Germany
Handball players at the 1988 Summer Olympics
Handball players at the 1992 Summer Olympics
People from Merseburg
Sportspeople from Saxony-Anhalt